Guess My Story is a British television series which aired from 1953 to 1955 (per a search of Radio Times listings) on the BBC. It was a panel game show aired in a 30-minute time-slot. It was conceived by William Taylor.

References

External links

1950s British game shows
1953 British television series debuts
1955 British television series endings
BBC Television shows
BBC television game shows
British panel games
British live television series
Black-and-white British television shows
Television game shows with incorrect disambiguation